The Valley of Fear is a British silent adventure film of 1916 directed by Alexander Butler and starring Harry Arthur Saintsbury, Daisy Burrell and Booth Conway. The film is an adaptation of the 1915 novel, The Valley of Fear by Arthur Conan Doyle featuring Sherlock Holmes. This is now considered a lost film.

Production
After the success of A Study in Scarlet in 1914, producer G. B. Samuelson decided to make another feature-length adaptation of Sherlock Holmes. French company Eclair owned the cinematic rights to Conan Doyle's stories up to 1912 which left only one full length story available, The Valley of Fear

While James Bragington was considered a virtual doppelgänger of Sherlock Holmes in A Study in Scarlet, the role in The Valley of Fear required more from an actor so H.A. Saintsbury was cast instead. Saintsbury had played the role onstage more than any other actor, over 1,000 times in both William Gillette's Sherlock Holmes as well as Conan Doyle's The Speckled Band. Arthur Cullin was cast as Watson, a role he would repeat seven years later in 1923's The Sign of the Four opposite Eille Norwood as Holmes.

Cast
 Harry Arthur Saintsbury - Sherlock Holmes 
 Daisy Burrell - Ettie Shafter 
 Booth Conway - Professor Moriarty 
 Jack McCauley - McGinty 
 Cecil Mannering - John McMurdo 
 Arthur M. Cullin - Doctor Watson 
 Lionel d'Aragon - Captain Marvin 
 Bernard Vaughan - Shafter 
 Jack Clare - Ted Baldwin

See also
List of lost films

References

External links

The Valley of Fear at SilentEra

1916 films
1916 adventure films
1916 lost films
British adventure films
British black-and-white films
British detective films
British silent feature films
1910s English-language films
Films based on mystery novels
Films directed by Alexander Butler
Films set in England
Lost adventure films
Lost British films
Sherlock Holmes films based on works by Arthur Conan Doyle
Silent adventure films
1910s British films
Silent mystery films
Silent thriller films